Carolina Ortega Yuste (born 30 July 1991) is a Spanish actress. Her film credits include performances in Carmen & Lola, Quién te cantará and Sky High. She has also featured in television series La sonata del silencio and Brigada Costa del Sol.

Biography 
Carolina Ortega Yuste was born on 30 July 1991 in Badajoz, Extremadura. She trained at the Real Escuela Superior de Arte Dramático (RESAD) in Madrid. 

She won the Goya Award for Best Supporting Actress in 2019 for her role as Paqui in Carmen y Lola.

Filmography 

Television

Film

References

External links 
 

1991 births
Spanish film actresses
Spanish television actresses
Living people
Best Supporting Actress Goya Award winners
21st-century Spanish actresses
People from Badajoz